Heterogymna ochrogramma is a moth in the family Carposinidae. It was described by Edward Meyrick in 1913. It is found in Bhutan, China and Japan.

References

Carposinidae
Moths described in 1913